Hope Woodlands is a civil parish in the High Peak district of Derbyshire, England. The parish contains eight listed buildings that are recorded in the National Heritage List for England.  All the listed buildings are designated at Grade II, the lowest of the three grades, which is applied to "buildings of national importance and special interest". The parish consists of moorland and countryside, and there are no significant settlements. The listed buildings consist of farmhouses, farm buildings, a milestone, and two bridges.


Buildings

References

Citations

Sources

 

Lists of listed buildings in Derbyshire